Hither Green Cemetery, opened as Lee Cemetery in 1873, is a large cemetery located on Verdant Lane, London, England. The cemetery is situated between Catford, Hither Green, Grove Park and Lee, located adjacent to a railway line, and close to Grove Park Sidings and Grove Park Nature Reserve. Next to Hither Green Cemetery is Lewisham Crematorium that was opened in 1956.

The cemetery was designed by Francis Thorne and included two Gothic chapels – one Anglican, one for dissenters (the Dissenters' Chapel, built by William Webster, was for people belonging to nonconformist, ie: non-Anglican, churches) – and ornamental entrance gates. The original gate lodge was demolished.

When the cemetery opened in 1873, it was named Lee Cemetery, although Lee's church and centre are about 1.5 miles (2.5 km) to the north of the cemetery, the land was covered by the Lee civil Parish at the time. The original cemetery occupied what is now the northernmost part of the cemetery, located on a road named Hither Green Lane, but was renamed Verndant Lane later. The cemetery expanded into a much larger southward, into lands previously occupied by the fields of a farm named Shroefield Farm.

Particularly notable graves and memorials

1939–1945 War Memorial

In the cemetery, there is a memorial to all those who died at their post during World War II, erected in 1951. This is situated next to the Sandhurst Road School memorial.

Civilian war graves

 There is a large terraced area which was built as a memorial to the 38 children and six teachers who died when Sandhurst Road School was bombed on Wednesday 20 January 1943.
 Next to the memorial for the bombing, there is also a grave of some of the children and a teacher whose families chose to bury their dead together.
 William Hume Campbell M.A (priest), founder and first principal of St Christopher's College, Blackheath.

Military war graves
The cemetery contains the graves of 39 Commonwealth service personnel of World War I and 198 from World War II.  Those whose graves could not be marked by CWGC headstones are listed on the Screen Wall memorial in the main War Graves plot.

Melton Prior
Melton Prior (1845–1910), was an English artist and war correspondent[1] for The Illustrated London News from the early 1870s until 1904. Prior was one of the leading illustrators of late Victorian Britain, noted for his ability to quickly sketch scenes. His pencil sketches were sent back to London where they were re-drawn by studio artists and engraved on wood-blocks for printing in the Saturday issues of the Illustrated London News. In addition to covering conflicts around the world, he also traveled on a number of Royal tours including accompanying the Prince of Wales [2] to Canada in 1901.

Leland Lewis Duncan
Leland Lewis Duncan , Colfeian, historian and photographer (born 24 August 1862) was buried here following his death on 26 December 1923. Marking the 75th anniversary of his death, a headstone was erected on his grave as a tribute to his work in recording the history of Lewisham and surrounding areas. The headstone was funded by donations from the Old Colfeian's, Lewisham Council, various local groups (including local history groups) and surviving family.

William Colbeck
William Colbeck mariner who made two journeys to Antarctica, first with the Norwegian Carsten Borchgrevink and then in 1900 in command of the relief ship Morning, sent to resupply Captain Scott's Discovery, then trapped in the ice at McMurdo Sound in the Antarctic.

Gallery

Transport links

Bus
Hither Green Cemetery and Lewisham Crematorium is best served by the 284 bus route from Grove Park or Lewisham, Ladywell and Catford.

They are also served by the London Buses route 124 bus route from Eltham, Middle Park and Downham or Catford.

Train
The cemetery and crematorium is within walking distance of Hither Green station and Grove Park station.

Alternatively, 284 bus links Grove Park station with the cemetery and crematorium and the 284 and 124 bus routes link Catford station and Catford Bridge station with the cemetery and crematorium.

References

External links

 Hither Green Cemetery (LB Lewisham)

Cemeteries in London
Parks and open spaces in the London Borough of Lewisham
Religion in the London Borough of Lewisham
1873 establishments in England
Commonwealth War Graves Commission cemeteries in England
Grove Park, Lewisham